Arthur Zorn (born 1954) is a musician and artist from Montpelier, Vermont. Zorn is a composer of vocal and piano music. His major pieces, "January 25th, 1945" (about the liberation of Auschwitz) and "Garden Sketches" (a suite for piano) have been performed all around New England. Currently, Zorn resides in Barre Town, Vermont and formerly taught vocal music at Spaulding High School.

In addition to being a musician, Zorn has received praise from all around the United States and Canada for his impressionist and abstract artwork. In July 2007, Zorn's newest artwork was to have been featured in the third installment of the Bundy Gallery's powerful series based on Zorn's creations; the third installment was to have been called "Zorn 3."

Arthur Zorn has won several awards for his teaching: he was elected Spaulding High School Teacher of the Year in 1994, and also won the Jaycee Outstanding Young Educator earlier in his career. Zorn has been a finalist in the Vermont State Teacher of the Year.

References

External links

American male composers
21st-century American composers
Living people
21st-century American male musicians
1954 births
People from Montpelier, Vermont
Musicians from Vermont
Schoolteachers from Vermont
20th-century American educators
20th-century American musicians
21st-century American educators
20th-century American male musicians